is a Japanese manga series written by Mikoto Yamaguchi and illustrated by Mario. It was serialized on Kodansha's Comic Days online platform from June 2019 to January 2022, with its chapters collected in seven tankōbon volumes.

Publication
Written by Mikoto Yamaguchi and illustrated by Mario, Who Wants to Marry a Billionaire? was serialized on Kodansha's Comic Days online platform from June 28, 2019, to January 21, 2022. Kodansha collected its chapters in seven tankōbon volumes, released from November 13, 2019, to March 9, 2022.

In North America, Seven Seas Entertainment announced the English release of the manga under its Ghost Ship adult imprint in both print and digital formats starting in December 2021.

Volume list

See also
Dead Tube, another manga series written by Mikoto Yamaguchi
Tomodachi Game, another manga series conceptualized by Mikoto Yamaguchi

Notes

References

External links
  
 

Drama anime and manga
Harem anime and manga
Japanese webcomics
Kodansha manga
Seinen manga
Seven Seas Entertainment titles
Webcomics in print